also known as Sazer-X the Movie in English) is a 2005 tokusatsu superhero film by Toho Company Ltd.  The film is based on all the warriors of the Chouseishin Series. It was directed by Kazuki Omori, known abroad for his contributions to the Godzilla series.  Sazer-X the Movie was released on December 17, 2005, with a duration of 70 minutes. The DVD was released on May 26, 2006.

Plot 
The film starts with the Sazer-X playing basketball. All of a sudden, a flash of lightning strikes Earth. They headed for it, and discovered a boy. The boy was Riki, who pretended to forget everything.

On the other hand, Remy informs the Sazer-X that a giant monster, 'Mecha Giant Beast Bulgario', had approached Earth and was destroying buildings. The Sazer-X defeated the monster anyway. But then something flashed into their eyes, Takuto had mistaken it for a Cosmo Capsule. It was, in fact, a Bosquito that existed inside Bulgario, which was later explained by Professor Horiguchi.

The Bosquito absorbed the JustiPowers on Sazer Island, reproduced and disguised themselves into Justirisers. The boy Riki was sent by the Space Pirates to steal the Cosmo Capsules. Riki was convinced that the Earthlings were the Bosquito and were responsible for the elimination of their planet. Vengeance arose in his mind, so he accepted the proposal made by the Space Pirates.

Later, he realizes that humanity was not the Bosquito and the space pirates were the ones who deceived him in the hope of getting the Cosmo Capsules.

The Bosquito commenced to massacre thousands of people by absorbing them. The attires were the only thing left of the people and were all fallen on the ground. The real Justirisers could not believe this scenario. They tried to transform, but it was in vain. National Defense made a space battleship – called 'Interception Battleship Gouten' – to invade the Bosquito. They also sent 'Type-05 GS Assist Robot Yuuhi', but it was soon destroyed. The Justirisers went to Sazer Island and found Mio Tendou lying senseless. All of them helped get back the JustiPowers. Soon, Riki breaks G2 and the Sazer-X were incapable of transforming. Takuto was taken by the space pirates and was sent to the Phantom Ship, where he saves people from other planets (who were destroyed by the Bosquito), including Riki's mother and father.

Takuto's grandfather (Sojirou Ando) repaired G2, but soon Riki steals G2. Riki then realizes the deception of the space pirates and so resolved not to handover the Cosmo Capsules to them. Rather, he kept G2 with him and let the Sazer-X transform again. Professor Horiguchi kept a Crystal Slab, which would react to the only one whose heart is full of love, courage and justice. Luckily that person was Riki, who helped the Gransazers to get back their powers. The Justirisers and Gransazers fought against thousands of Bosquito. Then the Sazer-X came to help. They combined their powers and destroyed many of the Bosquito. But quickly, the Phantom Ship crashed on Earth and absorbed all the powers of the other Bosquito on Earth and formed the Mammoth-Bosquito dragon, which was enormous in size, that even the Chouseishin and all other robots were tiny compared to it.

With the assistance of the Gotengo, The Mammoth-Bosquito was destroyed by Great-Lio using the final move, Howling Crush, in which the power of the Gransazers, Justirisers and Sazer-X combined into the finishing attack that destroyed the monster.

Cast

Characters

Mecha, monster and other appearances

Soundtrack
The soundtrack for the 2005 feature film that combines characters from the three Star God shows into a single storyline. One's reaction to the soundtrack itself will differ greatly, as most of the music is just extended themes from the Super Fleet Sazer-X show as opposed to a completely original score. Hiroshi Takagi did compose some unique music for the movie, but it is few and far between here. For all intents and purposes, the music also sounds like the same very limited size orchestra from the show was also used, as the music does not sound any more "grand" as one would have hoped for a feature film. Regardless, there are a couple of nice cues off this release, in particular "The Terrible Beast Appears!" which conveys an almost serial-like mentality to the monster appearing, befitting the show it comes from, along with "Large Pinch!" which is probably the most interesting cue from the show and that not too surprisingly goes for the movie as well.

The disc also features some recycled themes from previous Toho endeavors, such as the "Life Goes On" song from The Gransazers (2003) and the title song for The Justirisers (2004), both of which are present in their shorter versions instead of the extended tracks. Among the reoccurring music is Akira Ifukube's "Gotengo Theme," which is the one that plays when the ship flies off to face the Mu submarine in the original film Atragon (1963).

References

External links
Super Star Fleet Chousei Kantai Sazer-X the Movie: Fight! Star Warriors: Fight! Star Soldiers - Toho Kingdom
DVD - Toho Kingdom

2005 films
2000s monster movies
Chouseishin Series
Toho tokusatsu
Tokusatsu television series
Kaiju films
2000s Japanese films